Prius Online, also known by its retitled name Arcane Saga Online, is a Free-to-play 3D fantasy massively multiplayer online role-playing game (MMORPG) which revolves around a three character (3C) playing system. The 3C system consists of your main character, the Anima, and the Gigas. The Anima is your character's companion, and the relationship you develop with her, as you try to unravel the mysteries of her forgotten past, determine her personality and strengthen your bonds. The Gigas, summoned by the Anima in times of battle, are strategic and dynamic mercenaries that fight by your side. Through this system the game aims to create rich and immersive emotional experiences for the character and the Anima.

It was originally launched only for Korea in 2008. Launched internationally by gPotato in 2011, the service by gPotato was discontinued on March 27, 2012. The game was discontinued on December 17, 2013, in South Korea.

History 
Prius Online was first launched in 2008, but was only available in Korean.

In the summer of 2011, the game was localized to English and launched internationally, with no regional restrictions.

In September 2013 a Prius private server was opened.

Death of Kim Sa-rang 
On September 24, 2009, Kim Sa-rang, a 3-month-old Korean child, died from malnutrition after both her parents spent hours each day in an internet cafe playing Prius Online. The incident was featured in the 2014 Sundance Film Festival-debuted documentary Love Child.

References

External links 
 Prius Anima Official (Online)
 Official Korean site (Offline)

2008 video games
Massively multiplayer online role-playing games
Video games developed in South Korea
Fantasy massively multiplayer online role-playing games
Products and services discontinued in 2013
Inactive massively multiplayer online games
Windows games
Windows-only games